Zamfirovo is a village in Berkovitsa Municipality, Montana Province, north-western Bulgaria.

References

Villages in Montana Province